Hugh Michael Seely, 1st Baron Sherwood (2 October 1898 – 1 April 1970), known as Sir Hugh Seely, 3rd Baronet of Sherwood Lodge, Nottinghamshire, from 1926 to 1941, was a British Liberal politician.

Early life
Seely was born on 2 October 1898 into a family of politicians, industrialists and significant landowners. His great-grandfather Charles Seely, grandfather Sir Charles Seely, 1st Baronet, father Sir Charles Seely, 2nd Baronet, and uncle John Edward Bernard Seely, 1st Baron Mottistone were all Members of Parliament. His mother, Hilda Lucy Grant, was the daughter of Richard Tassell Anthony Grant and the granddaughter of inventor Sir Thomas Tassell Grant. His brother Victor's son was Sir Nigel Edward Seely.

Seely was educated at Eton College and became a lieutenant in the Grenadier Guards.

Career
He served with the Auxiliary Air Force and was the Commanding Officer for No. 504 Squadron RAF from 1936 to 1938. He was a Member of Parliament (MP) for East Norfolk from 1923 to 1924, High Sheriff of Nottinghamshire for 1925 and MP for Berwick-upon-Tweed from 1935 to 1941. He was the Joint Under-Secretary of State for Air during a large part of the Second World War (1941–45). In 1946 he acquired and was Chairman of the famous gunmaker James Purdey and Sons.

He was created Baron Sherwood, of Calverton in the County of Nottingham on 14 August 1941.

Personal life
On 23 March 1942, he married Hon. Molly Patricia (née Berry) Chetwode, daughter of William Berry, 1st Viscount Camrose, who owned The Daily Telegraph newspaper. She was the widow of Roger Charles George Chetwode (a son of Philip Chetwode, 1st Baron Chetwode), with whom she had two sons.  The marriage was short lived, however, as the couple divorced in 1948. She later married Sir Richard Cotterell, 5th Baronet in 1958.

Lord Sherwood remarried to Catherine ( Thornton) Ranger (widow of John Osborne Ranger) on 16 March 1970, shortly before his death on 1 April 1970. As he had no children, the barony became extinct upon his death. His brother Victor Seely inherited the baronetcy.

See also
Seely baronets

References

Further reading
Burke's Peerage and Baronetage 107th Edition Volume III [ *Burke's Peerage and Baronetage 107th Edition Volume III  
Information on the Seely family estates at the UK National Registry of Archives
Wight Life April/May 1975 article on The Seely Family and their Island Homes 
The Great Houses of Nottinghamshire, Sherwood Lodge (1881)
Correspondence with Winston Churchill

External links 
 

Sherwood, Hugh Seely, 1st Baron
Sherwood, Hugh Seely, 1st Baron
Grenadier Guards officers
High Sheriffs of Nottinghamshire
Liberal Party (UK) MPs for English constituencies
Ministers in the Churchill wartime government, 1940–1945
People educated at Eton College
People from Calverton, Nottinghamshire
Hugh
UK MPs 1923–1924
UK MPs 1935–1945
UK MPs who were granted peerages
Barons created by George VI